Yellow thistle is a common name for several plants and may refer to:

Argemone mexicana, native to Mexico
Cirsium erisithales, native to southern and eastern Europe
Cirsium horridulum, native to the United States